La Evolución Romantic Style is the second studio album by Panamanian singer Flex. It was released on January 27, 2009. A special edition was also released on the same day. It was nominated for a Lo Nuestro Award for Urban Album of the Year. It also received a nomination for the Billboard Latin Music Award for Latin Rhythm Album of the Year in 2010.

Track listing

Standard edition

Special edition

 Tracks #13-15 are only included in the special edition of the cd.

Charts

Weekly charts

Year-end charts

References

2009 albums
Flex (singer) albums
Spanish-language albums